Aaron Grymes (born March 1, 1991) is a Canadian football defensive back for the Edmonton Elks of the Canadian Football League (CFL). He played college football at Idaho. Grymes made his professional debut for the Edmonton Eskimos in 2013 and has also been a member of the Philadelphia Eagles of the National Football League (NFL) and BC Lions of the CFL.

College career
Grymes played for the Idaho Vandals from 2009 to 2012.

Professional career

Edmonton Eskimos
Grymes signed with the Edmonton Eskimos on May 29, 2013. He won his first professional championship with the Eskimos in the 103rd Grey Cup victory over Ottawa.

Philadelphia Eagles
Grymes signed with the Philadelphia Eagles on February 18, 2016. Grymes was released during final roster cuts and was later re-signed to the practice squad on October 24, 2016. He was promoted to the Eagles active roster on November 11, 2016. He was released by the Eagles on November 21 and was re-signed to the practice squad. He signed a reserve/future contract with the Eagles on January 2, 2017. He was waived on September 1, 2017.

Edmonton Eskimos (II)
Following his NFL release, Grymes re-signed with the Edmonton Eskimos and played in six games to finish the 2017 CFL season. In 2018, he played in 17 games, recording 58 defensive tackles, five special teams tackles, and three interceptions.

BC Lions
On the first day of 2019 free agency, Grymes signed with the BC Lions for the 2019 season. Grymes played in 16 games for the Lions in 2019, recording 54 defensive tackles and one interception. He missed the final two games of the season after suffering a torn ACL in Week 18. He did not play in 2020 due to the cancellation of the 2020 CFL season and was released by the Lions on February 5, 2021.

Edmonton Elks
Grymes signed a one-year contract with the Edmonton Elks on February 6, 2021.

References

External links
 BC Lions profile
 Edmonton Eskimos profile

1991 births
Living people
American football defensive backs
American players of Canadian football
BC Lions players
Canadian football defensive backs
Edmonton Elks players
Idaho Vandals football players
Players of American football from Seattle
Players of Canadian football from Seattle
Philadelphia Eagles players
West Seattle High School alumni